The sine quadrant (Arabic:), sometimes known as the "sinecal quadrant", was a type of quadrant used by medieval Arabic astronomers. The instrument could be used to measure celestial angles, to tell time, to find directions, to perform trigonometric computations, or to determine the apparent positions of any celestial object for any time. The name is derived from the Arabic  meaning 'a quarter' and  meaning 'marked with sine'.  It was described by Muhammad ibn Mūsā al-Khwārizmī in 9th-century Baghdad, and was used throughout the medieval Islamic period to determine the proper times for Islamic prayer.

Description

The instrument is a quarter of a circle made of wood or metal (usually brass) divided on its arc side into 90 equal parts or degrees.  The 90 divisions are gathered in 18 groups of five degrees each and are generally numbered both ways from the ends of the arc.  That is, one set of numbers begins at the left end of the arc and goes to 90 at the right end while the other set the zero is at the right and the 90 is at the left.  This double numbering enables the instrument to measure either celestial altitude or zenith distance or both simultaneously.

At the apex where the two graduated straight sides of the grid pattern meet in a right angle there is a pin hole with a cord in it and a small weight on the free end with a small bead that slides along the cord. The cord is called  and is used as a plumb line when measuring celestial altitudes.  It is also used as the indicator of angles when doing calculations with the instrument.  The sliding bead facilitates trigonometric calculations with the instrument.

Traditionally the line from the beginning of the arc to the apex is called  and the line from the end of the arc to the apex is called .

It is graduated to the number base 60 and not to the base 10 or decimal system presently used. Time, angular measurement and geographical coordinate measurements are about the only hold-overs from the Sumerian/Babylonian number system that are still in current use.

Measuring a celestial altitude with the quadrant

On one of the straight edges of the non-maritime quadrant (solid sheet form), there are two sighting plates which are called .  Each of the alignment plates has a small, centrally placed aperture or pinhole, with the two apertures (front and back) forming the optical axis through which one sights an incline object or Sun.  The light rays from the Sun pass through both apertures, the spot image of the Sun is concentric with the center of the rear plate pinhole, imaging on to a finger (project screen) if desired but not necessary or less frequent the eye at night. The hanging plum line serves two functions, the first being to provide a means (indicator) to reading the angular orientation of the instrument, the second function ensuring that the instrument, when optically aligned with the object of interest, is situated parallel to the vertical plane (perpendicular with the ground).

It has been stated by non-astronomers and non-navigators that two people are required to use the small instrument successfully: one to take the sight and one to read the cord (plum line) position on the radius segment and incorrect presumption as the instrument is to be held flush (face on) and below eye level with a single user, the two holes used for projecting the image of the Sun, not direct sighting.  As seen from the photograph, it is easy to optically align the instrument with the Sun using the simple image projection method with the device held in a single hand.  At the moment of alignment, one views the face of the instrument to read the angular position of the cord relative to the radii segment of the instrument.  However, it does help to have another person write down the scale readings as they are taken if a single operator is not able to do so because of environmental conditions, the single operator not having the capability to sufficiently hold the device stable, retaining the optical alignment, with just one hand.

Making altitude (elevation) measurements of the Sun is simple and direct, requiring the user to align the image of the Sun through the front pinhole (aperture), centered onto the rear back plate which operates more like a mask and not a viewing pass hole for sighting the Sun with the naked eye. Much in the same manner as performing eyepiece projection with a telescope, one fashioned with a front and rear aperture (front lens and rear eyepiece) along with a projection screen behind the eyepiece, or more rudimentary, the projecting of the Sun's image upon a small screen plate such as that done with a mariner's back staff. The rear, or second aperture (pass hole) works as a blacken attenuator so that any reflecting, annulus-shaped sunlight off the metal aperture is not too bright, the Sun's image (light) passing through the second hole and similar in task though void of a fixed image plane, to that of an iris (diaphragm) in a camera lens to reduce the light intensity.  For relative to human physiology, focusing on a bright spot of light such as a pinpoint image of the Sun for any extended period or repetitively over a short duration of time adversely effects momentarily, a person's visual acuity, thus making it more challenging to focus one's eyes to read the angular scale. It is typical to orientate the instrument such that the operator faces looking slightly down upon the scale, the Sun at the user's left, with the right hand placed in such a way that the rays of sunlight pass through the two perforated sighting plates, forming a bright illuminated spot on the observer's finger (see photo), the finger functioning as a projection screen.  At the moment an optical alignment with the Sun is established, the angular value of the device is read by the operator at the point where the graduated scale is bisected by the hanging plumb line.

These instruments, with poor angular resolution, were not principally intended to function with stars at night as an astronomical measuring device. It is impractical to sight a star through the front aperture less on a fixed, stabilized mount relative to the half degree width of the very intense Sun. The maritime (navigation) version of these devices is skeletal in design rather than a solid sheet form, so as to limit buffeting or displacement of the instrument from wind exposure while in the operator's hand.

References

External links
Deconstructing the Sine Quadrant-Part 1: Introduction – The Astrolabe Project

Astronomical instruments
Astronomy in the medieval Islamic world
Technology in the medieval Islamic world